Laugharne Rugby Football Club is a rugby union team from the village of Laugharne, West Wales. They presently play in the Welsh Rugby Union Division Four West League.

History
The earliest recorded evidence of a rugby team in Laugharne comes from a team photo taken in 1893, though it could be argued that the game was played as early as a decade before, though no proof survives. The early years saw rugby in Laugharne being played on a non-affiliated basis, with most matches being friendlies, though in the 1930s the club entered a league in Pembrokeshire.

In the 1970/71 season Laugharne RFC finally joined the West Wales Rugby Union and started playing competitive games.

Club badge

The team badge consists of a shield divided into quarters. Cockle shells, a castle, a Celtic cross and a coat of arms tell of Laugharne’s links with the sea, its seashore castle and the old feudal and township system.

References

External links
Laugharne RFC Official club site.

Rugby clubs established in 1893
Welsh rugby union teams
Sport in Carmarthenshire
1893 establishments in Wales
Laugharne